Jovian Chronicles Mechanical Catalog, subtitled "Exo-Armors & Spacecraft", is a supplement published by Dream Pod 9 in 1997 for the science fiction mecha role-playing game Jovian Chronicles that details various spaceships.

Contents
Jovian Chronicles Mechanical Catalog is a supplement containing details of numerous space vehicles, including missile cruisers, escort carriers, space stations, and cargo haulers, each one illustrated and presenting diagrams and blueprints.

Publication history
Dream Pod 9 published the Jovian Chronicles role-playing game in 1997, and immediately published the Mechanical Catalog, a 136-page softcover book designed by Philippe Boulle, Tyler Millson-Taylor, Marc A. Vezina, with interior art by Ghislain Barbe, Normand Bilodeau, and Bobbi Burquel, and cover art by Ghislain Barbe.

Reception
In Issue 244 of Dragon (February 1998), Rick Swan called this book "a nuts-and-bolts nirvana" aimed "at players more interested in hardware than human beings." He concluded by giving it an above average rating of 5 out of 6, saying, "With its striking graphics, sharp text and meticulous blueprints, the Mechanical Catalog rivals the best of FASA's BattleTech Technical Readouts series.

References

Role-playing game supplements introduced in 1997
Science fiction role-playing game supplements